Doug Stephan  is an American radio talk show personality who independently syndicates and hosts several national syndicated radio shows for Radio America.

Radio Programs
Doug Stephan's "DJV Show" is a morning talkradio program airing live Monday through Friday from 4am until 10am Eastern Time. featuring a fast paced format covering variety of topics.

Stephan also hosts "DJV Health Show," The TalkRadio Countdown Show, "The American Family Farmer" and "Your Hidden Power.

Doug Stephan, born November 5, 1946, began his career in radio as a deejay in the early 1960s in Tiffin, Ohio and thereafter decided to become a talk radio show host. He broadcasts from his home in Framingham, Massachusetts, where he operates a dairy farm.

Other ventures
Stephan's company Tiffin Broadcasting, LLC owned WTTF (1600 kHz, W227BJ 93.3 MHz) in Tiffin, Ohio, the same station where he began his broadcasting career.  In late 2008, Stephan announced his intention to donate WTTF to his alma mater Heidelberg College; Heidelberg declined to acquire the station, and it was instead sold to Anthony Paradiso, a business partner of Stephan's, in 2014.

His company Viva Communications formerly owned WSDE AM, 1190 kHz in Cobleskill, New York. WSDE, whose call sign comes from Stephan's initials, remains an affiliate of Stephan's "Good Day" program.

References

External links
 
 

1946 births
American radio DJs
Farmers from Massachusetts
American radio executives
American talk radio hosts
Heidelberg University (Ohio) alumni
Living people
People from Framingham, Massachusetts
People from Tiffin, Ohio